Fei or FEI may refer to:

Places
 Fei County, in Shandong, China

People 
 Fei (surname) (费), a Chinese surname and given name
 Fei (singer), stage name of Chinese singer, actress, presenter and model Wang Feifei (born 1987)

Organizations
 Centro Universitário da FEI, a university in Brazil
 Falange Española Independiente, a defunct Spanish political party
 Federal Executive Institute, an American government executive learning institute
 Financial Executives International, an American organization for senior-level financial executives
 International Federation for Equestrian Sports

Other uses 
 Fei (letter) in the Hebrew alphabet
 Battle of Fei (disambiguation)
 FEI Company, an American scientific instrumentation company
 Special Independent Prosecutor, in Puerto Rico

See also
FI (disambiguation)
Fie (disambiguation)